Cromeria is a small genus of fish in the family Kneriidae found in fresh waters in the Sudan, Mali, and Guinea in the Nile and Niger Rivers of Africa. These reach a length of up to 4.4 cm.
The currently recognized species are:

Cromeria nilotica Boulenger, 1901 (naked shellear)
Cromeria occidentalis Daget, 1954

References 

Eschmeyer, William N., ed. (1998). Catalog of Fishes Special Publication of the Center for Biodiversity Research and Information, no. 1, vol 1–3. p. 2905. California Academy of Sciences: San Francisco, USA. .	
Wu, H.L., K.-T. Shao and C.F. Lai (eds.) (1999). Latin-Chinese dictionary of fishes names.

Kneriidae
Freshwater fish of Africa
Freshwater fish genera
Taxa named by George Albert Boulenger